Marestella Torres-Sunang (born February 20, 1981) is a Filipino long jumper.

Career
Torres-Sunang started long jumping in 1994 in Negros Oriental. Her talent was recognized by her teachers but she often train with a limited budget doing jumps on rice husks rather than a proper sand pit.

Torres-Sunang finished fourth at the 2002 Asian Championships and won the silver medal at the 2005 Asian Championships. She also competed at the 2005 World Championships without reaching the final. She also participated in the 2008 Olympics in Beijing, China. In 2009, she surprisingly won the 2009 Asian Championships with a leap of 6.51 m.

Her personal best jump of 6.71 m, achieved at the 2011 Southeast Asian Games in Palembang, is currently the Southeast Asian Games Record.

Torres-Sunang finished 22nd of 32 at the 2012 London Olympic Games, failing to advance to the final.

On April 7, 2016, Torres-Sunang, who came from maternity with the help of her coach and sponsor James Michael Lafferty and nutritionist-wife Carol Lafferty, won the gold medal in the women's long jump event of the 2016 Ayala-PATAFA Philippine National Open Invitationals held at the Philsports Arena. She registered a 6.60 m jump in her 5th attempt, falling 10 centimeters short from the Olympic qualifying standard.

In May 2016, the International Association of Athletics Federations (IAAF) formally accepted the nomination made by the Philippine Athletics Track and Field Association (PATAFA) for the universality slot of Torres-Sunang in the 2016 Summer Olympics. However, the slot was junked after the inclusion of marathon runner Mary Joy Tabal in the Rio-bound Philippine delegation.

In July 2016, Torres-Sunang achieved the Olympic qualifying standard in the Women's Long Jump in the Kazakhstan Open and setting a new national record of 6.72 meters, thus making it into the Rio Olympics. This would be the third straight and the final Olympic appearance for the Filipina long jumper, who is the most senior member of the national contingent.

Personal life
She is married to a fellow Filipino athlete, shot putter Eliezer Sunang with who she has a son.

Personal bests
(Outdoor)
Long Jump : 6.72 m (+0.8 m/s) – Kazakhstan Open , Almaty, Kazakhstan, 04 July 2016
Triple Jump : 12.67 m  – Manila, Philippines, 03 June 2004
100 Meters: 12.44 – 2007 World Championships, Osaka, Japan. 26 August 2007
(Indoor)
Long Jump : 6.06 m  –  Aspire Dome, Doha, 13 March 2010

International competitions

External links

References

1981 births
Living people
Sportspeople from Negros Oriental
Filipino female long jumpers
Olympic track and field athletes of the Philippines
Athletes (track and field) at the 2008 Summer Olympics
Athletes (track and field) at the 2012 Summer Olympics
Athletes (track and field) at the 2016 Summer Olympics
Asian Games competitors for the Philippines
Athletes (track and field) at the 2002 Asian Games
Athletes (track and field) at the 2006 Asian Games
Athletes (track and field) at the 2010 Asian Games
Athletes (track and field) at the 2014 Asian Games
Athletes (track and field) at the 2018 Asian Games
University Athletic Association of the Philippines players
Southeast Asian Games medalists in athletics
Southeast Asian Games gold medalists for the Philippines
Southeast Asian Games bronze medalists for the Philippines
Competitors at the 2017 Southeast Asian Games
Competitors at the 2021 Southeast Asian Games
Competitors at the 2005 Southeast Asian Games
Competitors at the 2007 Southeast Asian Games
Competitors at the 2009 Southeast Asian Games
Competitors at the 2011 Southeast Asian Games
Competitors at the 2015 Southeast Asian Games